Stephen, Steve, Stevie, or Steven Smith may refer to:

Academics
Steve Smith (political scientist) (born 1952), British international relations theorist and senior university manager
Stephen Smith (journalist) (born 1956), American journalist, anthropologist, biographer, editor, historian, and writer
Stephen Smith (surgeon) (1823–1922), U.S. researcher in public health
Stephen Alexander Smith, Canadian legal scholar, writer, professor of law at McGill University
Steven B. Smith (professor) (born 1951), Yale professor
Stephen C. Smith (economist) (born 1955), George Washington University professor
Stephen C. Smith (sociologist) (born 1968), Brigham Young University-Idaho professor
Steven S. Smith (born 1953), Washington University professor
Stephen Edward Smith (1927–1990), professor and legal scholar in New Zealand
Stephen D. Smith (born 1967), British Holocaust specialist
Stephen J Smith (physiologist), professor of physiology at the Stanford University School of Medicine
Stephen Kevin Smith, British Vice-President for Research at Nanyang Technological University
Steven M. Smith, British plant geneticist
W. Stephen Smith (born 1950), American voice teacher, Northwestern University professor
Stephen Smith (historian) (born 1952), British historian and academic

Arts and entertainment
Steve Smith (comedian) (born 1945), Canadian comedian, best known for his alter ego, Red Green
Steven B. Smith (poet) (born 1946), U.S. underground poet, artist, and publisher
Steve Smith (clown) (born 1951), American clown
Stevie Smith (1902–1971), British poet
Steven Ross Smith (born 1945), Canadian poet, writer, journalist and arts activist
Stephen H. Smith, American sculptor
Stephen Catterson Smith (1806–1872), English-Irish portrait painter
Steven C. Smith (author), American biographer

Music
Steve Smith (American musician) (born 1954), jazz and rock drummer
Steve Smith (American singer) (born 1945), American singer
Steve Smith (British musician), provided vocals for Dirty Vegas and Steve Mac
Elliott Smith (Steven Smith, 1969–2003), musician 
Stephan Smith (born 1968), American singer-songwriter and activist
Steven R. Smith, multi-instrumentalist, instrument-builder and initiator of the Hala Strana project

Politics
Stephen Smith (Australian politician) (born 1955), Australian Labor Party politician, Minister for Defence and member for Perth
Stephen Smith (resident commissioner) (1887–1948), Resident Commissioner in the Cook Islands
Stephen Smith (Whitewater) (born 1949), gubernatorial aide to Bill Clinton
Stephen Edward Smith (1927–1990), brother-in-law and campaign manager for John F. Kennedy
Stephen J. Smith (politician) (born 1951), American politician and member of the Wisconsin State Assembly
Steve Smith (Minnesota politician) (1949–2014), American politician and member of the Minnesota House of Representatives
Stephen K. Smith (1894–1981), politician in Newfoundland, Canada
Steven S. Smith (born 1953), political science professor and author
Stephen Stat Smith (born 1955), American politician and member of the Massachusetts House of Representatives
Steven Wayne Smith (born 1961), Texas Supreme Court justice
Steve Smith (Arizona politician), member of the Arizona House of Representatives
Steven D. Smith (born 1964), member and Deputy Speaker of the New Hampshire House of Representatives

Sports

American football
Steve Smith Sr. (born 1979), retired wide receiver who played with the Carolina Panthers and Baltimore Ravens
Steve Smith (wide receiver, born 1974), arena football offensive specialist
Steve Smith (wide receiver, born 1985), former Super Bowl winner with the New York Giants
Steve Smith (quarterback) (born 1962), player for the University of Michigan Wolverines, 1980–1983
Steve Smith (running back) (1964–2021), player for the Los Angeles Raiders and Seattle Seahawks
Steve Smith (offensive lineman) (born 1944), offensive tackle & defensive end for Pittsburgh Steelers, Minnesota Vikings & Philadelphia Eagles
Steven Smith (American football coach) (born 1976), head football coach at Lincoln University in Missouri

Association football
Steve Smith (footballer, born 1874), English international footballer
Steve Smith (footballer, born 1899), Scottish football goalkeeper
Steve Smith (footballer, born 1946), English footballer and manager (Huddersfield Town)
Steve Smith (footballer, born 1957), English footballer (Birmingham City, Bradford City and Crewe Alexandra)
Steven Smith (footballer, born 1985), Scottish footballer
Stephen Smith (footballer, born 1986), English footballer

Athletics
Steve Smith (pole vaulter) (1951–2020), American pole vaulter
Steve Smith (American high jumper) (born 1971), American high jumper
Steve Smith (British high jumper) (born 1973), British high jumper

Baseball
Steve Smith (infielder) (born 1952), Cleveland Indians third base coach and former infielder
Steve Smith (pitcher) (born 1961), American baseball coach and former pitcher

Basketball
Steve Smith (basketball) (born 1969), retired NBA player, basketball analyst
Steven Smith (basketball) (born 1983), American basketball player
Stephen A. Smith (born 1967), sportswriter, NBA analyst, talk show host
Stevin Smith (born 1972), American basketball player
Steve Smith (basketball coach), American head coach for Oak Hill Academy basketball team

Cricket
Steve Smith (cricketer) (born 1989), Australian international cricketer
Steve Smith (cricketer, born 1961), Australian, Australian Rebel, and Transvaal cricketer
Stephen Smith (cricketer) (1822–1890), English cricketer

Ice hockey
Steve Smith (ice hockey, born in Canada) (born 1963), ice hockey player for the Philadelphia Flyers and the Buffalo Sabres
Steve Smith (ice hockey, born in Scotland) (born 1963), ice hockey player for the Edmonton Oilers, Chicago Blackhawks, and the Calgary Flames

Rugby union
Steve Smith (rugby union, born 1959), Irish rugby union player and British Lion
Steve Smith (rugby union, born 1973) (born 1973), Manu Samoa & North Harbour Rugby Union player from New Zealand
Steve Smith (rugby union, born 1951) (born 1951), English rugby union player and British Lion

Other sports
Stephen Smith (rugby league), Fijian rugby league international
Stephen Smith (boxer) (born 1985), British boxer
Steve Smith (cyclist) (1989–2016), Canadian mountain biker
Steve Smith (pool player) (born 1954), American pool player
Steven Smith (Australian rules footballer) (born 1956), former Australian rules footballer and current President of the Melbourne Cricket Club
Steven Smith (equestrian) (born 1962), British equestrian
Steve Smith (darts player) (born 1979), English darts player

Other people
Steven Smith (astronaut) (born 1958), American technology executive and NASA astronaut
Steven Smith (teamaker) (1949–2015), American tea entrepreneur
Stephen Smith (aerospace engineer) (1891–1951), pioneer of rocket mail in India
Stephen Francis Smith (1861–1928), Canadian chess master
Stephen A. Smith (born 1967), television personality
Steven G. Smith, United States Navy officer
Steve Smith (general) (born 1959), senior officer in the Australian Army Reserve
Stephen G. Smith (writer) (born 1949), American writer and editor
Stephen G. Smith (general), U.S. Army general
Stephen R. Smith (1836–1889), Adjutant General of the State of Connecticut
Stephen Smith (abolitionist) (1797–1873), Pennsylvanian African American abolitionist
Stephen Anderson Smith (born 1962), American clean energy activist
Stephen Smith (privateer) (1739–1806)

Characters
Steve Smith (American Dad!), in American Dad!

See also
Stefan Smith (born 1989), Antiguan footballer
Steve Schmidt (disambiguation)